The DKW 3=6 is a compact front-wheel drive saloon manufactured by Auto Union GmbH. The car was launched at the Frankfurt Motor Show in March 1953 and sold until 1959. It carried the name Sonderklasse ("Special Class") on the right hand fender of all steel bodied models - this being part of the model name for this range.  The first model in the range was named by factory project number, DKW F91, which was replaced by the F93 and F94 models from the 1956 model year. The F93 and F94 models were referred to by Auto Union as the "Big DKW 3=6" (Großer 3=6). From 1958, by which year the car's successor, the Auto Union 1000 Coupe de Luxe,  was already being sold and the earlier version had therefore become, in essence, a ‘run-out’ model, it was known more simply (in the USA only) as the DKW 900.

The 3=6's notable features included its 896cc two-stroke engine and front-wheel drive layout along with the sure-footed handling that resulted.

The car was known as a fast, reliable performer -and received much praise from the motoring press of the day. The Australian "Wheels" magazine called the 1957 F93 model the "Triple-Banger Rocket". Similiarly, the South African "CAR" magazine of November 1957 said;

"If you yearn to own a sports car, but, for family reasons, you must have a saloon that is capable of seating four or five people, the DKW 3=6 will probably appeal to you immensely".

In addition to its home country and continental Europe, the 3=6 model was sold in many countries worldwide including South Africa, Rhodesia (Zimbabwe), South West Africa (Namibia), Kenya, New Zealand, Sri Lanka, Canada and the USA.

In a market segment increasingly dominated by the Volkswagen Beetle, the Auto Union contender also boasted class leading interior space, especially after the arrival of the four-door version, which featured a modestly extended wheelbase.

The DKW 3=6 in due course replaced the DKW F89 / Meisterklasse, although the Meisterklasse remained in production until April 1954. In its turn, the 3=6 was succeeded by the more powerful Auto Union 1000, offered already from late 1957 for the 1958 model year.

The DKW 3=6 was a campaigned very successfully in motorsport in the 1950's and early 1960's. Notable outright victories include the 1954 European Rally Championship at the hands of Walter Schlüter, as well the 1956 East African Coronation Safari (later known as the Safari Rally ) in the hands of Eric Cecil and Tony Vickers. The DKW 3=6 was driven in motorsport, by many notable drivers including Jim Clark, Tony Brooks, Sarel van der Merwe and Juan Manuel Fangio (1965 Interlagos, Brazil).  In South Africa, in particular, sales were bolstered by the motorsport successes of Sarel van der Merwe Snr (father of Sarel van der Merwe), Coenraad Spamer and Tom Campher. In 1957 alone, the list of South African motorsport events won by the DKW 3=6 was sizeable - including the 1957 Protea Trial, 1957 Lourenco Marques Rally and the 1957 Vaal Gold Cup Rally.

The DKW Monza (based on the DKW 3=6), set five world records in 1956 in the displacement class up to 1.1 litres with an average speed of almost 140 km/h (86.9 mph).

 4,000 miles with an average speed of 140.839 km/h (87.513 mph)
 48 hours with an average speed of 140.961 km/h (87.589 mph)
 5,000 miles with an average speed of 138.656 km/h (86.157 mph)
 10,000 miles with an average speed of 139.453 km/h (86.652 mph)
 72 hours with an average speed of 139.459 km/h (86.656 mph)

The DKW 3=6 also enjoyed several famous owners, like the celebrated aviator Elly Beinhorn (who named her 3=6 "Alwine VII"), German boxing legend Max Schmeling (twice heavyweight World Champion) and film star Anita Ekberg (star of La Dolce Vita (1960)).

In recognition of the model's significance, Audi Tradition maintain a 1954 DKW 3=6 Sonderklasse in their fleet, and this is occasionally brought out on historical motoring events.

Many names 
DKW was one of four companies that had come together in 1932 to form the Auto Union based in Zwickau. The company was effectively refounded in West Germany in 1949, following the loss to the Soviets of its Zwickau assets. Three of the four businesses that had constituted Auto Union before the war seemed unlikely ever to reappear on either side of the Iron Curtain, but starting in 1949 the DKW name was used for the F89 assembled by Auto Union in the west: this was the model replaced by the 3=6.

 The name ‘Sonderklasse’ differentiated the car from the previous model which had been known as the ‘Meisterklasse’. Both names had also been used for commercially successful DKWs in the 1930s. Sonderklasse is a German verbal concatenation that does not translate comfortably into English: it is based on the word ‘Sonder’ of which one translation is ‘special’, linked to the word ‘Klasse’ which translates as ‘class’, or category’.
 The name ‘3=6’ started out as an advertising slogan, but by the time of the 1955 face lift (for the 1956 model year), the name was to the fore, and the car was advertised as the ‘Large 3=6’ (Großer 3=6) differentiating it from the earlier version which already carried the script ‘3=6’ ahead of the door on its left side. The point of the advertising slogan was to highlight an equivalence between the car's two stroke three cylinder engine and a four stroke six cylinder engine. The underlying logic was that with the two-stroke cycle there is engine power produced by a combustion within each cylinder for every rotation of the crankshaft: with the four-stroke cycle there is power produced by a combustion within each cylinder only for each alternate rotation of the crankshaft. Thus it was asserted that the two-stroke engine was working twice as hard per rotation of the engine.   In terms of torque the two-stroke system does indeed appear to have conferred substantial benefits when compared to a four-stroke engine of similar size, but in terms of bhp much of the theoretical energy gain in terms of power output seems to have been dissipated as additional heat which in turn required a larger energy consuming cooling fan, all of which made the arrangement rather noisy when placed just ahead of the driver and front-seat passenger.
 The name F91 was the factory project number of the car. ‘F’ stood for ‘Frontantrieb’ (Frontwheel drive). The F91 was an evolution from the DKW F9 which had been a prototype presented in 1938, planned for production at Auto Union's Zwickau plant from 1940. By 1950 the F9 itself had been made production ready and was being produced as the IFA F9 in Zwickau, so that name was in practice not available to ‘old’ Auto Union's western successor. The DKW F91 was replaced by the F93 followed by the F94, their names also taken from factory project numbers. Because the other names have proved increasingly unfathomable, the names F91, F93 and F94 are the ones commonly used retrospectively.

It was perhaps in recognition that any perceived marketing advantages available from the unconventional namings had been exhausted, that from 1958 the car was sold simply as the DKW 900 (in the USA only), the name being now conventionally based on the car's approximate engine displacement. The successor model, already in production in 1957, also benefited from this less challenging nomenclature.

The bodies
The F91 was presented as a two-door saloon with front opening doors which presumably facilitated access. A ‘pillarless’ coupe version, first seen in 1953, was produced from 1954, as well as a cabriolet, bodied by Osnabrück coach builders Karmann.   In addition there was a three-door estate version, called the ‘Universal’, which continued to be offered unchanged until 1956.

Modifications came progressively. The coupe version had been launched with a ‘panoramic’ three piece wrap around back window, and in the back end of 1954 a similar wrap-around back window appeared on the two-door saloon. Advertising highlighted such features as a fuel gauge and an interior light that could be set to come on automatically when the door was opened.

1955 saw the launch of the F93 version (for the 1956 model year), also known as the Big DKW 3=6. This shared the  wheel-base of the F91, but was slightly longer, wider and taller. In place of horizontal metal slats, the new model featured an oval shaped front grill containing five horizontal metal coloured slats. The oval grill was modified again in 1957 when the slats were replaced by a chrome coloured grid design. Inside there were improvements to the instrumentation and the heating, as well as a modest increase in power to 40 bhp.

The DKW Monza which appeared in 1956 was essentially a DKW F93 under its (light-weight plastic) skin.

In 1956, with the introduction of the F94 version of the car, a four-door version finally became available. The F94 four door saloon and F94 Universal shared the same chassis.

DKW in Brazil

Auto Union cars were also very popular in South America, where a number of special types based on the DKW 3=6 were manufactured in Brazil under licence by VEMAG from 1956 to 1967. Models sold were the DKW Belcar sedan, the Vemaguet station wagon, and the Fissore, a two-door coupe with a smooth designed body and elegant appointments, which resembled in general terms the DKW F102. The F94 line made by DKW-Vemag was equipped with doors hinged at the front (from 1964) and four headlights (in 1967). Altogether about 109,343 cars were built in Brazil.

Technical
The 896 cc three cylinder engine provided at launch a claimed . Following the company's pioneering work in the 1930s, the car had a front-wheel drive configuration which meant there was no bulky driveshaft running through the passenger cabin. The water cooled engine was installed longitudinally above the front wheels - the first appearance of the longitudinal "overhung" engine layout which DKW's successor - Audi -  still uses to the present day, but the radiator was located not ahead of the engine but between the engine and the passenger cabin.

The gearbox, controlled by a column mounted lever, was a three speed manual system coupled with a free-wheel device: in Autumn 1953 a four speed box was offered as an option. In late 1956, a four speed gearbox became standard, with all but the first gear, fully synchronised. 1956 saw a further transmission advance with the availability of a Saxomat automatic centrifugal clutch on the DKW.

The F93 also incorporated a strengthened chassis and improvements to the suspension and braking system.

Data

Sources and further reading 

36
36
Compact cars
Front-wheel-drive vehicles
Cars introduced in 1953